Richard Johnstone (1936–2022) was a New Zealand Olympic cyclist.

Richard Johnstone may also refer to:
Richard Bempde Johnstone

See also
Richard Johnston (disambiguation)
Richard Johnson (disambiguation)